Senator Colón may refer to:

Héctor Martínez Colón, Senate of Puerto Rico
Rafael Hernández Colón (1936–2019), Senate of Puerto Rico